Mike Accursi (born February 25, 1975 in Pelham, Ontario) is a former professional lacrosse player. He is also a teacher and lacrosse coach at Holy Cross Catholic Secondary School in St. Catharines, Ontario. Accursi professionally coaches currently for the newly relocated lacrosse team, Halifax Thunderbirds of the National Lacrosse League, and has formally coached for the Rochester Knighthawks

Accursi has been very successful during his lacrosse career, winning two Champion's Cups in consecutive years with the Rochester Knighthawks and the Buffalo Bandits. He has also won two Mann Cups in the Canadian Lacrosse Association; one with the Brampton Excelsiors (2002) and one with the Peterborough Lakers (2004).

Junior career
For five years, Accursi played for the Burlington Chiefs and the St. Catharines Athletics of the OLA Junior A Lacrosse League. In 1993, Accursi was awarded the "P.C.O. Trophy" for Rookie of the Year.

Statistics

NLL

OLA

References

1975 births
Living people
Lacrosse forwards
Buffalo Bandits players
Canadian expatriate lacrosse people in the United States
Canadian lacrosse players
Canadian sportspeople of Italian descent
Edmonton Rush players
Halifax Thunderbirds coaches
Lacrosse people from Ontario
National Lacrosse League All-Stars
People from the Regional Municipality of Niagara
Rochester Knighthawks players